This was the first edition of the event.

Andrey Kuznetsov and Aleksandr Nedovyesov won the title, defeating Alex Bolt and Andrew Whittington 7–5, 6–4 in the final.

Seeds

Draw

References
 Main Draw

City of Onkaparinga ATP Challenger - Doubles
2015 Doubles
2015 in Australian tennis